Kotla Mughlan is a union council of Jampur Tehsil, Rajanpur District, Pakistan.

Geography 
It is situated 10 kilometers southeast of Jampur. It is at the edge of the Indus river. Haero lies to the east, Muhammad Pur is to the west, Kotla Dewaan is to the north and Boola Wala is to the south.

Demographics 
Mostly people speak Saraiki language there, along with Punjabi and Balochi is also used.

Education 
Two government high schools, one for girls and one for boys, as well as many private schools are present.
Iqra Public Elementary School
Aqsa Model Public School Kot Bodla https://www.facebook.com/AqsaModelPublicSchoolKotBodla 

Islamia Public High School
La raib Public School
Little angels School

Medical facilities
A hospital provides medical facilities to the people, along with private clinics. A veterinary clinic is available.

Economy 
Agriculture is the primary occupation.

See also
Dera Ghazi Khan
Punjab, Pakistan

References

Populated places in Rajanpur District